Robert Joseph Blackwell (born February 26, 1925) was an American government official. Blackwell was a native of Brooklyn, New York. He graduated from Syracuse University and Harvard Law School. He served in the U.S. Navy from 1943 to 1946. His government career began as an attorney with the Federal Maritime Board, then as director of several bureaus within the Federal Maritime Commission. In May 1969 he became deputy maritime administrator and in March 1971 Deputy Assistant Secretary of Commerce for Maritime Affairs. He served through the remainder of the Nixon and Ford Administrations and into the Carter Administration. He left that post in 1979, and was replaced by Samuel B. Nemirow.

In 1976 he received the VADM Land Medal  of the Society of Naval Architects & Marine Engineers for Outstanding Accomplishment in the Marine Field.

Writings
 "Implementation of the Merchant Marine Act of 1970". Journal of Maritime Law and Commerce, 167, 1973–1974

External links
 "Maritime Affairs Director to Address Senior Middies," Bangor Daily News, April 18, 1972

1925 births
Living people
People from Brooklyn
United States Department of Commerce officials
Syracuse University alumni
Harvard Law School alumni
United States Department of Transportation officials
Nixon administration personnel
Ford administration personnel
Carter administration personnel
United States Navy personnel of World War II